Gremzdy Polskie , is a village in the administrative district of Gmina Krasnopol, within Sejny County, Podlaskie Voivodeship, in north-eastern Poland.

Attractions
Gremzdy Polskie is home to Wigre Lake, as well as many cows and farms here and there.

References

Gremzdy Polskie